The Beliu is a left tributary of the river Crișul Negru in Romania. Formerly a right tributary of the Teuz, its flow is now diverted by a canal towards the Crișul Negru near Tăut, built in 1914–1919.

Tributaries

The following rivers are tributaries to the Beliu (from source to mouth):

Left: Hășmaș
Right: Urviș, Botfei, Mideș, Mocirla, Sartiș, Renișel, Barcău, Frunziș

References

Rivers of Romania
Rivers of Arad County